The 1960 Tour de France was run in the national team format. The four most important cycling nations of the time, Spain, Belgium, France and Italy, each sent a national team with fourteen cyclists. There were also five smaller national teams: a combined Luxembourg/Swiss team, a Dutch team, a German team, a British team, and a team of international cyclists, all with eight cyclists. Finally, there were five regional teams, also of eight cyclists each. Altogether, 128 cyclists started the race.

Jacques Anquetil, the winner of the 1957 Tour de France, had won the 1960 Giro d'Italia earlier that year. Anquetil was tired, and skipped the Tour. This made Roger Rivière the French team leader, and the big favourite for the Tour victory.

Start list

By team

By rider

By nationality

References

1960 Tour de France
1960